Cato Charles West was an American military officer and politician. He was Secretary of the Mississippi Territory and served as an acting territorial governor of Mississippi in 1804 and 1805. He corresponded with U. S. President Thomas Jefferson.

Career 
He was a militia commander and had land claims in the territory. He succeeded William C. C. Claiborne who was posted to New Orleans after Thomas Jefferson made the Louisiana Purchase. He received a memorial of grievances.

Legacy 
His family published a history on the bicentenary of his death.

See also 
List of governors of Mississippi

References 

18th-century births

19th-century deaths

Year of birth missing

Year of death missing
Governors of Mississippi Territory

Mississippi Territory officials
American militia officers
1804-related lists
1805-related lists
Mississippi-related lists